The Gradient Golden is a Czech single-place, paraglider designed and produced by Gradient sro of Prague. Originally produced in the mid-2000s, it was still in production in 2016 as the Golden 4.

Design and development
The Golden was designed as an intermediate glider and is the manufacturer's best selling model. The models are each named for their approximate wing area in square metres.

The Golden 4 is made from Porcher Marine Everlast fabric.

Variants
Golden 24
Small-sized model for lighter pilots. The glider model is DHV 1-2 certified.
Golden 26
Mid-sized model for medium-weight pilots. The glider model is DHV 1-2 certified.
Golden 28
Large-sized model for heavier pilots. The glider model is DHV 1-2 certified.
Golden 30
Extra large-sized model for much heavier pilots. The glider model is DHV 1-2 certified.
Golden 3 22
Extra small-sized model for very light pilots. The glider model is EN/LTF B/1-2 certified and has a glide ratio of 8.5:1.
Golden 3 24
Small-sized model for lighter pilots. The glider model is EN/LTF B/1-2 certified and has a glide ratio of 8.5:1.
Golden 3 26
Mid-sized model for medium-weight pilots. The glider model is EN/LTF B/1-2 certified and has a glide ratio of 8.5:1.
Golden 3 28
Large-sized model for heavier pilots. The glider model is EN/LTF B/1-2 certified and has a glide ratio of 8.5:1.
Golden 3 30
Extra large-sized model for much heavier pilots. The glider model is EN/LTF B/1-2 certified and has a glide ratio of 8.5:1.
Golden 4 22
Extra small-sized model for very light pilots. The glider model is EN/LTF B certified.
Golden 4 24
Small-sized model for lighter pilots. The glider model is EN/LTF B certified.
Golden 4 26
Mid-sized model for medium-weight pilots. The glider model is EN/LTF B certified.
Golden 4 28
Large-sized model for heavier pilots. The glider model is EN/LTF B certified.
Golden 4 30
Extra large-sized model for much heavier pilots. The glider model is EN/LTF B certified.

Specifications (Golden 26)

References

External links

Golden
Paragliders